Mouloudia Club d'Alger, referred to as MC Alger or MCA for short, is an Algerian football club based in Algiers. The club was founded in 1921 and its colours are red, green and white. Their home stadium, the Stade 5 Juillet 1962, has a capacity of 65,000 spectators.The club is currently playing in the Algerian Ligue Professionnelle 1.

Founded in 1921 as Mouloudia Club Algérois and Mouloudia Chaâbia d’Alger, the club was known as Mouloudia Pétroliers d'Alger  from 1977 to 1986 and changed its name to Mouloudia Club d'Alger in 1986. The club colours are red and green.

MC Alger were the first Algerian club to win a continental competition, winning the 1976 African Cup of Champions Clubs. They are one of the most successful Algerian clubs having won the domestic league 7 times, and the domestic cup 8 times, third to USM Alger, CR Belouizdad and ES Sétif.

History
In 1921, a group of youths from the Casbah and Bab El Oued neighborhoods joined to create the first Muslim football club in colonized Algeria. The group was led by Hamoud Aouf, who served as a liaison between the two groups. On August 7, 1921, the club was officially founded in the waiting room of the Benachere café. The date coincided with the Mawlid, hence the name Mouloudia Club d'Alger. Green, for the hope of the Algerian people and the traditional colour of Islam, and red, for the love of the nation, were chosen as the club colours.

In 1976, MC Alger qualified for the African Cup of Champions Clubs for the first time in its history after winning the 1974–75 Algerian Championnat National. They reached the final after beating Al-Ahly Benghazi of Libya, Al Ahly of Egypt, Luo Union of Kenya and Enugu Rangers of Nigeria, respectively. In the final, they met Guinean club Hafia Conakry, who had won the last edition of the competition. In the first leg in Conakry, MC Alger lost 3–0 and faced the difficult task of having to score three goals in the return leg. However, in the return leg, they managed to score the three goals with a brace from Omar Betrouni and a goal from Zoubir Bachi. They went on to win the penalty shootout 4–1 to win their first African title and also become the first Algerian club to win a continental competition.

Crest

Kit manufacturers

Honours

Domestic competitions
 Algerian League 1
Champions (7): 1971–72, 1974–75, 1975–76, 1977–78, 1978–79, 1998–99, 2009–10
Runners-up (5): 1962–63, 1969–70, 1988–89, 2016–17, 2019–20

 Algerian Cup
Winners (8) – shared record: 1970–71, 1972–73, 1975–76, 1982–83, 2005–06, 2006–07, 2013–14, 2015–16
Runners-up (1): 2012–13

 Algerian Super Cup
Winners (3) (record): 2006, 2007, 2014
Runner-up (1): 2016
 Algerian League Cup
Winners (1): 1998

International competitions
 CAF Champions League
Winners (1): 1976

Regional competitions
 Maghreb Cup Winners Cup
Winners (2): 1971, 1974

 North African Cup of Champions
Runners-up (1): 2010

 Maghreb Champions Cup
Runners-up (1): 1975

Performance in CAF competitions
African Cup of Champions Clubs / CAF Champions League: 8 appearances

1976 – Champion
1977 – Quarter-finals
1979 – Second Round
1980 – Quarter-finals

2000 – First Round
2011 – Group stage
2018 – Group stage
2021 – Quarter - finals

CAF Confederation Cup: 4 appearances
2007 – First Round
2008 – First Round
2015 – First Round
2017 – Quarter-finals

CAF Cup Winners' Cup: 1 appearance
1984 – Second Round

Players

Algerian teams are limited to two foreign players. The squad list includes only the principal nationality of each player;

Current squad
As of 5 February 2023

Reserve Squad

Personnel

Current technical staff

Notable players
Below are the notable former players who have represented MC Alger in league and international competition since the club's foundation in 1921. To appear in the section below, a player must have played in at least 100 official matches for the club or represented the national team for which the player is eligible during his stint with MC Alger or following his departure.

For a complete list of MC Alger players, see :Category:MC Alger players

 *Rachid Sebbar 
 *Aissa  Draoui
 *Abdelmalek Cherrad

Managers

 Mahmoud Hamid Bacha, Mustapha Biskri (1998)
 Abdelhamid Kermali, Mustapha Biski (1983–89), (1998-1999)
 Michel Renquin (2000-2001)
 Bachir Mechri, Ali Bencheikh, Bachta (2001-2002) 
 Noureddine Saâdi (2002– Dec 4, 2003)
 Hervé Revelli (Jan 1, 2004 – May 1, 2004)
 Jean-Paul Rabier (2004–05)
 Robert Nouzaret (July 1, 2005 – Dec 24, 2005)
 Noureddine Saâdi (Dec 2005 – March 2006)
 François Bracci (March 2006 – Oct 06)
 Hacène Matallah (Oct 2006 – Nov 06)
 Enrico Fabbro (Nov 2006 – Nov 07)
 Jean Thissen (Nov 2007 – Jan 08)
 Enrico Fabbro (Jan 2008 – Feb 08)
 Mohamed Mekhazni (Feb 2008 – March 8)
 Ameur Djamil (March 27, 2008 – Sept 21, 2008)
 Alain Michel (Sept 21, 2008 – Dec 09)
 François Bracci (Dec 2009–10)
 Alain Michel (June 2010 – March 15, 2011)
 Noureddine Zekri (March 11, 2011 – July 19, 2011)
 Abdelhak Menguellati (June 2011 – Aug 11)
 Abdelhak Benchikha (Sept 1, 2011 – Oct 5, 2011)
 François Bracci (Oct 23, 2011 – Feb 11, 2012)
 Kamel Bouhellal (Feb 10, 2012 – May 5, 2012)
 Abdelkrim Bira (May 4, 2012 – June 30, 2012)
 Patrick Liewig (July 1, 2012 – Aug 20, 2012)
 Jean-Paul Rabier (Aug 27, 2012 – Sept 23, 2012)
 Djamel Menad (Sept 24, 2012 – May 9, 2013)
 Farid Zemiti (interim) (May 10, 2013 – June 30, 2013)
 Alain Geiger (July 1, 2013 – Nov 10, 2013)
 Fouad Bouali (Nov 18, 2013–14)
 Artur Jorge (2014 – October 8, 2015)
 Meziane Ighil (October 13, 2015– February 2016)
 Lotfi Amrouche (Mars, 2016 – May 27, 2016)
 Djamel Menad (June, 2016– October, 2016)
 Kamel Mouassa (October, 2016– July, 2017)
 Bernard Casoni (August, 2017– August, 2018)
 Rafik Saifi (September 15, 2018– October 23, 2018)
 Adel Amrouche (October, 2018– March 12, 2019)
 Bernard Casoni (July, 2019– December 8, 2019)
 Mohamed Mekhazni (December 8, 2019– February 5, 2020)
 Nabil Neghiz (February 5, 2020 – February 4, 2021) 
 Abdelkader Amrani (February 7, 2021 – April 12, 2021) 
 Nabil Neghiz (April 28, 2021 –August 10, 2021) 
 Khaled Ben Yahia (September 1, 2021 –June 10, 2022) 
 Faruk Hadžibegić (July 16, 2022 –September 10, 2022) 
 Faouzi Benzarti (September 25, 2022 –)

References

External links

 
Football clubs in Algeria
Association football clubs established in 1921
Algerian Ligue Professionnelle 1 clubs
1921 establishments in Algeria
CAF Champions League winning clubs